Trowbridge & Livingston was an architectural practice based in New York City in the early 20th-century. The firm's partners were Samuel Beck Parkman Trowbridge and Goodhue Livingston. 

Often commissioned by well-heeled clients, much of the firm's work was built in the Upper East Side and Financial District neighborhoods of New York. Founded in 1894, the firm became known for its commercial, public, and institutional buildings, many in a Beaux Arts or neoclassical style. Some examples are the B. Altman and Company Building (1905), J. P. Morgan Building (1913), and the Oregon State Capitol (1938).

Partner biographies
Trowbridge (1862–1925), was the fourth of eight children born to William Petit Trowbridge and Lucy Parkman Trowbridge. His father was a military engineer who oversaw construction of Fort Totten Battery, and repairs to Fort Schuyler during the American Civil War. After the War, he became professor of mechanical engineering at Yale's Sheffield Scientific School in 1871, then at the Columbia School of Mines in 1877. The younger Trowbridge studied at Trinity College in Hartford, Connecticut. On graduating in 1883, he attended Columbia University, and later studied abroad at the American School of Classical Studies in Athens and at the École des Beaux-Arts in Paris. On his return to New York, he entered the office of George B. Post. Trowbridge worked in the firm for over 30 years, until his death in 1925.

Goodhue Livingston (1867–1951), from a distinguished family of colonial New York, received his undergraduate and graduate degrees from Columbia during the same period Trowbridge was at the school.

Firm activity

In 1894, Trowbridge, Livingston and Colt formed a partnership that lasted until 1897 when Stockton B. Colt left, and the firm became Trowbridge & Livingston. 

Its major commissions were received between 1901 and 1938, most in a Beaux Arts or neoclassical style. The majority of the firm's work was in New York City, where the firm designed several notable public and commercial buildings. Among the most famous are the neo-Baroque St. Regis New York (1904). and the B. Altman and Company Building (1906), both on Fifth Avenue. In particular, nearly all of the buildings at the intersection of Wall, Broad, and Nassau Streets in Manhattan's Financial District were designed by the firm: 14 Wall Street (1912), the Bankers Trust Building on the northwest corner; 11 Wall Street (1922), the New York Stock Exchange Annex on the southwest corner; and 23 Wall Street (1913) and 15 Broad Street (1927), the J. P. Morgan & Co. Building on the southwest corner.

Their practice extended to townhouses on Manhattan's Upper East Side, of which 41 East 65 Street (1910), 11 East 91st Street and 49 East 68th Street (1914) remain. The New York Society Library, a lending library with a long genteel tradition in New York, moved into the former John Rogers House at 53 East 79th Street.

Projects

New York City projects
 The Nathaniel L. McCready House (1896)
 123 East 63rd Street (1900)
 St. Regis New York (1901–1904), 2 East 55th Street (NYC Landmark)
 123 East 70th Street (1902–1903)
 The Knickerbocker Hotel (1902–1906), 1462–1470 Broadway (NYC Landmark and NRHP-listed)
 The Links Club (1902), 36 East 62nd Street 
 B. Altman and Company Building (1905), 351–57 Fifth Avenue (NYC Landmark)
 Engine Company 7, Ladder Company 1, FDNY (1905), 100 Duane Street (NYC Landmark)
 John B. and Caroline Trevor House (1909–1911), 11 East 91st Street (NYC Landmark)
 Benson Bennett Sloan House (1910), 41 East 65th Street
 Bankers Trust Company (1910–1912), 14 Wall Street (NYC Landmark)
 J.P. Morgan & Company Building (1913), 23 Wall Street (NYC Landmark and NRHP-listed)
 J. William and Margaretta C. Clark House (1913–1914), 49 East 68th Street (NYC Landmark)
 New York Society Library (1917), 53 East 79th Street (NYC Landmark)
 Extension to the New York Stock Exchange Building (1923), 8 Broad Street (NRHP-listed)
 American Museum of Natural History southeast extension (1912–1924),  West 77th Street and Central Park West
 44 Wall Street (1927)
 15 Broad Street (1928)
 The Hayden Planetarium (1935) at the American Museum of Natural History, West 81st Street and Central Park West

Projects outside New York City
 Bixby Memorial Free Library, (1911), Vergennes Vermont 
 Jordanville Public Library (1907–1908), Jordanville, New York, NRHP-listed
 St. Elizabeth's Memorial Chapel (1921), Tuxedo, New York
 The Gulf Building, now Gulf Tower (1932), Pittsburgh, Pennsylvania, in association with Edward Mellon;
 The Oregon State Capitol (1936–38) in Salem, in association with Francis Keally, NRHP-listed
 American National Red Cross, 17th and D Sts., NW Washington, D.C. Trowbridge & Livingston, NRHP-listed
 United States Post Office and Courthouse, Jct. of 7th and Grant Streets. Pittsburgh, Pennsylvania Trowbridge & Livingston, NRHP-listed

References

External links 
 Emporis: Trowbridge & Livingston

Defunct architecture firms based in New York City
1894 establishments in New York (state)